The DAF-8 nematode gene encoding a R-SMAD protein of TGF-beta signaling pathway, which was originally found in model organism Caenorhabditis elegans. When the TGF-β ligand daf-7 binds to the TGF-β receptors daf-1/daf-4 on the surface of nematode cell, daf-8 will be phosphorylated and forms a heterodimer with daf-14, then enter to the nucleus to inhibit transcription regulated by daf-3/daf-5.

References 

Caenorhabditis elegans genes